The 2020 USATF U20 Outdoor Championships will be the 49th edition of the annual national championship in outdoor track and field for American athletes aged under 20, organized by USA Track & Field. The three-day competition will take place on June 12–14 at the Ansin Sports Complex in Miramar, Florida. The Ansin Sports Complex will host the event for the second year in a row. It will be the sixth time the meet has been held in Florida.
Update: This competition was cancelled due to the Corona Virus pandemic.

Qualification
To enter an event at the national competition, athletes must achieve the event's entry standard performance.

 * = only performances measured by fully automatic timing (FAT) are accepted
 ** = Hand-timed performances may be accepted where no FAT time has been recorded by an athlete and are only measured to a tenth of a second.

Men's results

Men track events

Men field events

Women's results

Women track events

Women field events

World U20 team selection

The event will serve as the selection meet for the United States team for the 2020 World Athletics U20 Championships. In order to be selected for the national team, athletes must place in the top two of their event at the national competition and also need to achieve the international qualifying standard mark. The United States team, as managed by USA Track & Field, can also bring a qualified back up athlete in case one of the team members is unable to perform.

References

2020
USA Outdoors
Track, Outdoor
Sports competitions in Florida
USA Outdoor Track and Field Championships
Track and field in Florida